The Kazakhstan Sports Palace is a palace of sports located in Astana, Kazakhstan. It serves as the home for Nomad Nur-Sultan and HC Astana of the Kazakhstan Hockey Championship and Snezhnye Barsy junior hockey team of the Junior Hockey League. The arena seats 4,070 spectators for ice hockey.

History
The sports palace was built from 1999 to 2001. The palace was opened by the president of Kazakhstan Nursultan Nazarbayev on March 6, 2001. The Kazakhstan Sports Palace is one of the first sports venues in Nur-Sultan and is used for mass sport. The building contains a swimming pool, a health club, an ice hockey rink and many other amateur sports clubs. Until 2008 the hockey arena was used for multi-purpose events, such as boxing and basketball events. Until 2015, the arena hosted home games for Barys Astana.

The sports palace was reconstructed for hosting Men's ice hockey tournament of the 2011 Asian Winter Games.  Ice hockey preliminaries actually started two days before the Opening Ceremony of the Games on 30 January. The matches played in the main and newly built minor arena with 1,200 seats. Currently, the minor arena is the home arena for HC Astana of the Kazakhstan Hockey Championship.

In 2011, Kontinental Hockey League commissioners declared that this arena is one of the worst in the league. The main reason is the low capacity. Barys Astana managers decided to build the new Barys Arena with 12,000 seats. It opened for the 2015-16 KHL season.

See also
 List of Kontinental Hockey League arenas

References

External links

  
 
Kazakhstan Sports Palace on the Google Maps

Barys Astana arenas
Indoor ice hockey venues in Kazakhstan
Kontinental Hockey League venues
Sports venues in Astana